Hugh Marwick   (30 November 1881, Rousay, Orkney, Scotland – 21 May 1965, Kirkwall) was a Scottish scholar noted for his research on the Orkney Norn.

His MA was from the University of Edinburgh, who awarded his D.Litt. in 1926 after he had worked many years on his doctoral thesis, the basis for his book The Orkney Norn. While researching and writing, he was also headmaster of Kirkwall Grammar School (then called the Burgh School). He was appointed in 1914 after some years teaching in Lancashire, and continued as headmaster until 1929, when he was made director of the Orkney Education Committee, a post he held until 1946.

Dr Marwick was one of the founders of the Orkney Antiquarian Society in 1922 with fellow Orcadian and Norse enthusiast John Mooney JP, FSA (Scot) and was its secretary for 17 years, during which he contributed papers to its Proceedings. He was also a Fellow of the Society of Antiquaries of Scotland.

He was appointed an Officer of the Order of the British Empire in 1965.

Works 

 The Orkney Norn (1926 University of Edinburgh D.Litt. Thesis, 1929 Oxford University Press)
 The Place Names of Rousay (1947)
Orkney (1951)
Orkney Farm-Names (1952)

1881 births
1965 deaths
Alumni of the University of Edinburgh
Scottish antiquarians
Scottish linguists
Linguists of Norn
Schoolteachers from Lancashire
People from Orkney
Orcadian culture
Fellows of the Society of Antiquaries of Scotland
20th-century antiquarians